Owen Pinnell (born 6 January 1947) is a New Zealand bobsledder. He competed in the two man event at the 1988 Winter Olympics.

References

External links
 

1947 births
Living people
New Zealand male bobsledders
Olympic bobsledders of New Zealand
Bobsledders at the 1988 Winter Olympics
Sportspeople from Auckland